Michael Ross Schofield III (born November 15, 1990) is an American football offensive guard of the National Football League (NFL). He was drafted by the Denver Broncos in the third round of the 2014 NFL Draft. He played college football at Michigan.

Early life and education 
Schofield was born in Orland Park, Illinois. Schofield's father, Michael Schofield II, is a local fire chief.

Schofield liked baseball as a youth, but tagged along with his younger brother, Andrew, who liked to play football. He started to compete in football in sixth grade for the Orland Park Pioneers. In seventh grade, he played wide receiver and linebacker. As a sophomore at Sandburg High School, he became a lineman. By the time he was a senior, he was a special mention, 2008 Chicago Tribune All-State selection. Schofield signed with Michigan head coach Rich Rodriguez on February 4, 2009.

College career

Schofield earned 2013 All-Big Ten Conference honorable mention recognition from the coaches. He excelled in the pre 2014 Senior Bowl workouts earning NFL Network player of the day on Wednesday January 22. He worked out two days at offensive guard position (where he played as a sophomore for the 2011 Wolverines) before moving back to tackle where he played for the 2012 and 2013 teams.

Professional career

Denver Broncos
On the second day of the 2014 NFL Draft, the Denver Broncos drafted Schofield with the 95th overall selection in the third round. He was expected to sign a four-year contract worth approximately $2,761,200. On June 3, Schofield signed a four-year $2.75 million contract that included a $521,200 signing bonus. On February 7, 2016, Schofield was a starter on the Broncos Super Bowl 50 championship team that beat the Carolina Panthers by a score of 24–10.

On September 2, 2017, Schofield was waived by the Broncos.

Los Angeles Chargers
On September 3, 2017, Schofield was claimed off waivers by the Los Angeles Chargers. He played in 15 games, starting five in place of the injured Joe Barksdale at right tackle.

On March 14, 2018, Schofield signed a two-year contract extension with the Chargers. He started all 16 games at right guard for the Chargers in 2018.

He started all 16 games in 2019, playing 995 snaps at right guard for the Chargers.

Carolina Panthers
On May 2, 2020, Schofield signed with the Carolina Panthers, where he was reunited with former Broncos and Chargers offensive line teammate Russell Okung under former Chargers offensive line coach Pat Meyer, who held the same position with the Panthers. Schofield was placed on the reserve/COVID-19 list by the Panthers on October 19, 2020, and activated on November 4.

Baltimore Ravens
On June 8, 2021, Schofield signed a one-year deal with the Baltimore Ravens. He was released on August 30, 2021.

Los Angeles Chargers (second stint)
On September 17, 2021, Schofield signed with the Los Angeles Chargers. He started 12 games at right guard in place of an injured Oday Aboushi.

Chicago Bears
On July 25, 2022, Schofield signed with the Chicago Bears. He was released on August 30, 2022. On September 14, Schofield was re-signed by the Bears to their active roster. Schofield made his first start of the season at left guard in a week 7 victory over the New England Patriots on Monday Night Football. On January 4, 2023, Schofield was placed on injured reserve.

Personal life
Schofield is married to US Women's Ice Hockey Team forward Kendall Coyne Schofield, who won the gold medal on the US Olympic Hockey Team in Pyeongchang in February 2018. They both attended the same high school in Orland Park, but didn't start to date until they were both college-age athletes and met at a local gym. They wed in July 2018.

On March 1, 2021, the Chicago Red Stars of the National Women's Soccer League announced that Schofield and his spouse Kendall Coyne Schofield had joined the women's soccer team's ownership group.

References

External links 

Michael Schofield at Michigan Wolverines football
 

1990 births
Living people
American football offensive guards
American football offensive tackles
Baltimore Ravens players
Carolina Panthers players
Chicago Bears players
Denver Broncos players
Los Angeles Chargers players
Michigan Wolverines football players
People from Orland Park, Illinois
Players of American football from Illinois
Sportspeople from Cook County, Illinois
Chicago Red Stars owners